This list covers most artificial satellites built in and operated by the Republic of India. India has been successfully launching satellites of various types from 1975. Apart from Indian rockets, these satellites have been launched from various vehicles, including American, Russian and European rockets sometimes as well. The organization responsible for India's space program is Indian Space Research Organisation (ISRO) and it shoulders the bulk of the responsibility of designing, building, launching and operating these satellites.

Legend 
This is a list of Indian (wholly or partially owned, wholly or partially designed and/or manufactured) satellites and orbital space crafts, both operated by the Indian government (ISRO, Indian defence forces, other government agencies) or private (educational and research) entities. All satellite launches marked successful have completed at least one full orbital flight (no sub-orbital flights have been included in this list).

1970s 
Indian space missions began in the 1970s, with Soviet assistance in launching the first two satellites.

† In case of discrepancy in data between sources, N2YO and NASA NSSDCA is taken as the source of truth.
‡ Orbital Longitude is applicable only for Geostationary and Geosynchronous satellites.

1980s 
India had three continuous successful satellite launches from its first generation rocket SLV. ISRO had two running projects for next generation rockets based on SLV:
 ASLV to study and develop technologies to transfer satellites into geostationary orbit.
 PSLV to transfer higher payloads into polar and sun synchronous orbits.

ISRO did not have enough funds to run both projects simultaneously. Initial setbacks complexity led ISRO to terminate ASLV in just initial flights and focus on PSLV. Technologies to launch geostationary satellites arrived only in 2000s.

† In case of discrepancy in data between sources, N2YO and NASA NSSDCA is taken as the source of truth.
‡ Orbital Longitude is applicable only for Geostationary and Geosynchronous satellites.

1990s 
From this decade on, Polar Satellite Launch Vehicle (PSLV) arrived that allowed India to become self-reliant in launching most of its remote sensing satellites. However, for heavy geostationary systems, India continued to remain dependent on Europe entirely. Capability to launch geostationary satellites will arrive in next decade.

† In case of discrepancy in data between sources, N2YO and NASA NSSDCA is taken as the source of truth.
‡ Orbital Longitude is applicable only for Geostationary and Geosynchronous satellites.

2000s 
ISRO's workhorse, the PSLV, became the mainstay for successful launches of indigenous satellites from India during this decade. India successfully launched 11 geostationary or geosynchronous satellites during this period, which was equal to the total number of similar launches in the previous 2 decades put together. India's first extra terrestrial mission was also successfully executed during this period.

† In case of discrepancy in data between sources, N2YO and NASA NSSDCA is taken as the source of truth.
‡ Orbital Longitude is applicable only for Geostationary and Geosynchronous satellites.
§ All orbital data related to Chandrayaan-1 is for its lunar orbit only.

2010s 
While India had to face failure in launching relatively heavier satellites early on in the decade, it did end up launching 27 geosynchronous/geostationary satellites (17 with indigenous, and 10 with European launchers). In 2010s, it managed to launch most of its geosynchronous/geostationary satellites successfully on its own. This period also saw India enter the exclusive club of nations capable of launching probes to Mars. ISRO also improved upon its student/university outreach by launching multiple pico-, nano- and mini-satellites from various Indian universities. This period was also marked by multiple bilateral collaborations with foreign universities and research organizations. The same decade saw completion of NAVIC, India's regional navigation system.

Increased subcontracting to private vendors across the nation improved launch frequency by a factor of more than 2. India was able to fix glitches and operationalise its Geosynchronous Satellite Launch Vehicle with an indigenous upper stage and operationalise next generation launch vehicle GSLV Mk III with nearly double payload capacity, enabled the country to launch nearly all of its communication satellites. India launched its delayed Moon mission Chandrayaan-2 in 2019 which however failed to conduct soft landing on lunar surface. India also demonstrated capability to destroy "enemy" satellites in orbit. Increased application of India's space capabilities in strengthening its national security was observed.

Substantial increase in budget over the decade, increased payload capacity with increased reliability, increased launch frequency and many "firsts" in this decade had made Indian space program far more visible to world with significant coverage from international media and its hyphenation with leading spacefaring nations. The last launch of the decade marked with completion of 50 launches of PSLV rocket.

† In case of discrepancy in data between sources, N2YO and NASA NSSDCA is taken as the source of truth.
‡ Orbital Longitude is applicable only for Geostationary and Geosynchronous satellites.
§ All orbital data related to Mangalyaan-1 is for its Martian orbit only.
§ All orbital data related to Chandrayaan-2 is for its lunar orbit only.

2020s 
ISRO aims to conduct 50 launches between 2020 and 2024. Besides increasing the launch frequency to 12+ a year, a number of extraterrestrial exploration missions including Aditya L1, Chandrayaan-3, Lunar Polar Exploration Mission, Shukrayaan-1 and Mars Orbiter Mission 2 are planned for this decade. A mission to Jupiter after Shukrayaan and a mission to explore beyond Solar System have also been proposed. PSLV is expected to undergo its 100th flight mission in middle of the decade. India's new low cost Small Satellite Launch Vehicle is expected to make its maiden flight in January 2020 while SCE-200 which is expected to be the powerplant of India's upcoming heavy and super heavy launch systems, is expected to make first flight sometimes in middle of the decade. Conducting an orbital human spaceflight before August 2022 is the highest priority for the agency while the long term goals of the programme include human-occupied space stations and crewed lunar landing.

Forthcoming 
Following table lists Indian satellites in development and due for launch in near future.

Launch statistics 
Following statistics are on the basis of number of satellites launched that were built-in or were to be operated by India. It does not account number of launch vehicles used or special orbital missions like re-entry that aren't taken into account as satellites. It also does not account foreign satellites launched by India.

Decade wise 
The following bar chart lists number of Indian satellites launched decade-wise.

Country wise 
The following bar chart lists the number of satellites launched based on the origin of the launch vehicle

Other orbital and suborbital spacecraft

ISRO satellites launched by foreign agencies 
ISRO satellites which have been launched by foreign space agencies (of Europe, USSR / Russia, and United States) are enlisted in the given tables below.

ISRO satellites that were launched by foreign agencies, are listed in the table below.

See also 
 List of foreign satellites launched by India
 List of ISRO missions
 Space industry of India

References

External links 
 Indian Space Research Organization: Spacecraft 

Lists of satellites
Satellites
Satellites
 
Satellites